A booby trap is an antipersonnel device disguised as a harmless object.

Booby Trap may also refer to:
"Booby Trap" (Star Trek: The Next Generation), an episode of Star Trek: The Next Generation
Booby Trap (film), a 1957 British crime film
Booby Trap (novella), a 1944 Nero Wolfe story by Rex Stout
Booby Traps, a 1944 Warner Bros. Private Snafu cartoon directed by Bob Clampett
10 Seconds to Murder or Booby Trap, a 1973 exploitation movie directed by Carl Monson